Giovanni Severini (born April 23, 1993) is an Italian professional basketball player for Pallacanestro Cantù of the Italian Serie A2.

Career statistics

Lega Basket Serie A

|-
| style="text-align:left;"| 2009–10
| style="text-align:left;"| Siena
| 1 || 0 || 1 || .0 || .0 || .0 || .0 || .0 || .0 || .0 || .0
|-
| style="text-align:left;"| 2010–11
| style="text-align:left;"| Siena
| 4 || 0 || 1.7 || .333 || 1.000 || .0 || .0 || .0 || .0 || .0 || .7
|-
| style="text-align:left;"| 2011–12
| style="text-align:left;"| Siena
| 1 || 0 || 1 || .0 || .0 || .0 || .0 || .0 || .0 || .0 || .0
|-
| style="text-align:left;"| 2014–15
| style="text-align:left;"| Avellino
| 3 || 0 || 1 || .0 || .0 || .0 || .3 || .0 || .0 || .0 || .0
|-
| style="text-align:left;"| 2015–16
| style="text-align:left;"| Avellino
| 21 || 1 || 4.5 || .263 || .250 || .500 || .5 || .1 || .2 || .0 || .6
|- class="sortbottom"
| style="text-align:left;"| Career
| style="text-align:left;"|
| 30 || 1 || 3.6 || .171 || .300 || .250 || .4 || .1 || .1 || .0 || 0.5

External links
 Giovanni Severini at draftexpress.com
 Giovanni Severini at legabasket.it 

1993 births
Living people
Italian men's basketball players
Lega Basket Serie A players
Mens Sana Basket players
Pallacanestro Cantù players
Shooting guards
S.S. Felice Scandone players